Lattner is a surname. Notable people with the surname include:

 Chris Lattner (born 1978), American software developer
 Johnny Lattner (1932–2016), American football player

Germanic-language surnames
Jewish surnames